Enteromius choloensis, or the silver barb, is a species of freshwater fish in the  family Cyprinidae.

It is found only in Malawi.

Its natural habitat is rivers.

It is found only on the Ruo River and its tributary the Nswadzi River on the Thyolo escarpment above Zoa Falls. The Ruo is a tributary of the Shire River, part of the Zambezi system.

Sources 

Enteromius
Taxa named by John Roxborough Norman
Fish described in 1925
Cyprinid fish of Africa
Fish of Malawi
Endemic fauna of Malawi
Taxonomy articles created by Polbot